Rhododendron intricatum (隐蕊杜鹃) is a rhododendron species native to central and western Sichuan, as well as northern Yunnan, China, where it grows at altitudes of . The flowers are pale lavender, purple-blue to dark blue, or rarely yellowish.

This very compact shrub flowers profusely when it is only a few centimetres tall, and is also hardy, being an alpine plant. It is therefore a suitable subject for a rock garden.

References

 Franchet, J. Bot. (Morot). 9: 395. 1895.

intricatum